Nagan may refer to:
 Nagan, Markazi
 Nagan, Khash, Sistan and Baluchestan Province